The Samalkot–Kakinada Port branch line is a railway line connecting  and  of East Godavari district in the Indian state of Andhra Pradesh. Further, this section intersects Vijayawada–Nidadavolu loop line at Samalkot.

Jurisdiction 
The branch line is an electrified double-track railway line.

References

Rail transport in Andhra Pradesh

Transport in East Godavari district
Transport in Kakinada